St. Louis, Besancon, Historic District is a historic Roman Catholic church complex and national historic district located near New Haven in Jefferson Township, Allen County, Indiana. The district encompasses five contributing buildings and one contributing site consisting of the Saint Louis Besancon Roman Catholic Church and its cemetery and rectory.  The Gothic Revival style church was built in 1870-71 of brick, fired in a nearby kiln, then covered with cement to give an appearance of stone.  It features a steep gable roof and five part projecting square steeple.  The rectory was built in 1893, and is a -story, Queen Anne style brick dwelling. The other contributing resources are the St. Louis Academy (1915), St. Louis Convent House (1915), garage (1940), and Old St. Louis Cemetery. The church was refurbished and painted in 1998.

The district was listed on the National Register of Historic Places in 1995.

References

External links

St. Louis Besancon Catholic Church
St. Louis Besancon Academy
Saint Louis Besancon Cemetery at Find A Grave

Churches in the Roman Catholic Diocese of Fort Wayne–South Bend
Churches on the National Register of Historic Places in Indiana
Historic districts on the National Register of Historic Places in Indiana
Roman Catholic churches completed in 1871
19th-century Roman Catholic church buildings in the United States
Queen Anne architecture in Indiana
Gothic Revival church buildings in Indiana
Buildings and structures in Allen County, Indiana
National Register of Historic Places in Allen County, Indiana